Zapotok is a village in the hills south of Ig in central Slovenia. The entire Municipality of Ig is part of the traditional region of Inner Carniola and is now included in the Central Slovenia Statistical Region.

History
During the Second World War, Italian forces burned the village on March 19, 1942. On July 23, 1942, Italian forces shot fourteen men as hostages in Zapotok; they are all buried at the cemetery on Kurešček Hill in Visoko. After the war, a collective farm was established in Zapotok. It was initially used to raise cattle, then to produce plastic for a year, then converted into a factory for wooden ware, and finally into a poultry feedlot.

Mass grave
Zapotok is the site of a mass grave associated with the Second World War. It contains the remains of unknown victims.

References

External links

Zapotok on Geopedia

Populated places in the Municipality of Ig